Richland is an unincorporated village in Valley County, Montana, United States. Richland is located in northeast Valley County near the Daniels County line. The community has a post office with ZIP code 59260.

The town had a post office from 1913 to 1919. In 1926, Richland moved about 15 miles southeast to a location along a branch line of the Great Northern Railway that extended from Flaxville to Opheim.

References

Unincorporated communities in Valley County, Montana
Unincorporated communities in Montana